Lodha people are one of Schedule Tribes and PVTGs of India, primarily living in West Bengal and Odisha. Lodhas of West Bengal mostly live the Paschim Medinipur and Jhargham districts. A section of the Lodha has converted to Islam, and formed a distinct community called the Lodha Muslims.

Demographics
As per 2001 census, Lodhas numbered 84,966 and formed 1.9 per cent of the scheduled tribe population of West Bengal. They had a literacy rate of 34.8 per cent. As per the 2011 census, the Lodhas population is 108,707 and 9,785 in West Bengal and Odisha respectively.

The Lodhas of Odisha are primarily found in Suliapada and Morada blocks of  Baripada sub-division of Mayurbhanj district of Orissa.

Focus
Lodha means piece of flesh named after their ancestor. Lodhas have been in the focus of anthropologists and social activists. During the early period of their rule, the British government in India oppressed the tribal people of Jungle Mahals, who were traditionally dependent upon the forests for a living. They had revolted but were ruthlessly suppressed. Having been deprived of their livelihood and without any alternatives, they took to criminal ways of life and were subsequently branded a criminal tribe. They should properly be labelled as uprooted rebels. Lodha titles are Nayek, Mallick, Digar, Sardar, Bhokta, Kotal, Dandapat, Bhunya etc. These titles were also used by the Sabars. One of the most important research on the Lodhas was done by a Calcutta University faculty, Professor Prabodh Kumar Bhowmick.
Much later, researchers from the Department of Anthropology at Vidyasagar University have done empirical studies on the development scenario of the Lodha tribe in Mendinpur district who were by that time declared as a 'Primitive Tribal Group' (PTG) by the Government of India.

See also
 Chuni Kotal

References

Further reading
  

Ethnic groups in India
Indigenous peoples of South Asia
Scheduled Tribes of Odisha
Scheduled Tribes of West Bengal
Scheduled Tribes of Bihar
Scheduled Tribes of Jharkhand